The Khasavyurtovsky okrug was a district (okrug) of the Terek Oblast of the Caucasus Viceroyalty of the Russian Empire. The area of the Khasavyurtovsky okrug made up part of the North Caucasian Federal District of Russia. The district was eponymously named for its administrative centre, Khasavyurt.

Administrative divisions 
The subcounties (uchastoks) of the Khasavyurtovsky okrug were as follows:

History 

The formation of the Mountain Autonomous Soviet Socialist Republic in 1921 raised the question of the fate of the Khasavyurtovsky okrug, which was part of the Terek oblast. There were two main nationalities living in the district – Kumyks and Chechens. In March 1921, when the desire of the Kumyks to join the Dagestan Autonomous Soviet Socialist Republic became obvious, and the Chechens-Aukhovites — to the Mountain ASSR (which includes Chechnya), the problem arose of dividing the Khasavyurtovsky okrug between two neighboring autonomies: Mountain and Dagestan ASSRs. However, this option didn't suit the Chechens-Aukhovites. As a result, the congress of the Aukhovites, without making a concrete decision on the issue of joining the Mountain or Dagestan ASSR, limited itself to the demand of the Aukhovites in any case to preserve the Khasavyurtovsky okrug as a separate administrative unit. This was interpreted by the Khasavyurtovsky Revkom as the Aukhovites staying in the Khasavyurtovsky okrug as part of the Dagestan ASSR. This interpretation was actually supported by the commander of the Caucasian Labour Army, V. S. Muromtsev, who headed the commission for the establishment of borders between Dagestan and the Mountain ASSR. The statement of the Aukhov delegation made on 12 April 1921 in Vladikavkaz about the desire to join the Mountain ASSR was ignored. The annexation of the Khasavyurtovsky okrug to Dagestan was finalised in September 1921.

Bolshevik revolutionary and Soviet politician Sergei Kirov wrote the following to Dagestan regarding the accession of the Khasavyurt district:

Demographics

Russian Empire Census 
The majority of the population indicated Kumyk to be their mother tongue, with significant Chechen, Avar-Andean, and Nogai speaking minorities.

Kavkazskiy kalendar 

Notes

References

Bibliography 

Okrugs of Terek Oblast